Phenomena is a 1985 Italian supernatural horror giallo film directed by Dario Argento and starring Jennifer Connelly, Daria Nicolodi, and Donald Pleasence. The plot concerns an American girl at a remote Swiss boarding school who discovers she has psychic powers that allow her to communicate with insects, and uses them to pursue a serial killer who is butchering young women at and around the school.

After its release in Italy, Phenomena was purchased for distribution in the United States by New Line Cinema, who excised over 20 minutes of the original cut, releasing it under the alternate title Creepers. This shortened version was also released in the United Kingdom the following year in the spring of 1986.

Plot
After missing a bus in the Swiss countryside, a 14-year-old Danish tourist, Vera Brandt, tries looking for help. She comes across a cottage and is attacked and beheaded by a stranger. Eight months later, her case is being inspected by forensic entomologist John McGregor and Inspector Rudolf Geiger of the Kantonpolizei, who note that Brandt is but the first of a series of murders against young girls, including McGregor's former assistant.

Meanwhile, Jennifer Corvino, the daughter of a famous American actor, arrives at the Swiss Richard Wagner Academy for Girls, chaperoned by Frau Brückner, who places her with roommate Sophie. While sleepwalking through the academy and out onto the roof, Jennifer witnesses a student being murdered. She awakens and flees into the woods, where McGregor's chimpanzee, Inga, finds her and leads her to him. Upon noticing the affection his captive insects have for Jennifer, McGregor comes to believe that she has a telepathic link with them. Back at the academy, the headmistress has Jennifer medically tested via EEG for her sleepwalking. The procedure makes Jennifer uneasy when she gets brief visions of the previous night's events.

The following night, the murderer kills Sophie, mistaking her for Jennifer as she is wearing the same sweater she wore when she witnessed the prior murder. Jennifer sleepwalks again and is led by a firefly to the scene of Sophie's death, where she finds a maggot-infested glove. She shows it to McGregor, who identifies the maggots as the larvae of Great Sarcophagus flies, which are drawn to decaying human flesh. He theorises that the killer is a necrophile who has been keeping his victims close to him post-mortem, unintentionally collecting the maggots on himself.

Later, when the other students taunt Jennifer over her connection to insects, she summons a swarm of flies that covers the entire building, then faints. Convinced that Jennifer is "diabolic" and possibly responsible for the killings, the headmistress arranges for her to be transferred to a mental hospital. Jennifer flees to McGregor's home, where the entomologist gives her a glass case with a Great Sarcophagus fly, suggesting she use it to find the murderer's lair. The fly leads her to the same cottage Brandt had found earlier and Inspector Geiger talks to the real estate agent in order to learn the identity of the house's previous occupant.

That night, McGregor is murdered in his home. With nowhere left to go, Jennifer calls her father's lawyer Morris Shapiro to take her back to America. He alerts Brückner, who offers to let the girl stay at her house overnight. Meanwhile, Geiger's investigation leads him to a mental hospital in Basel where he learns that a former staff member had been attacked 15 years before by one of the male inmates.

Upon arriving at Brückner's house, Jennifer notices that all the mirrors are covered, with Brückner explaining that she has a son who cannot stand to see his own reflection. Brückner insists that Jennifer take pills before she goes to bed; when she does so, she becomes sick and, assuming that the pills are poisonous, coughs them up. She attempts to call Morris but is knocked unconscious by Brückner. Geiger arrives and questions Brückner, who confirms that she had worked at the Basel mental hospital and been raped. She leads him to the basement and imprisons him.

After waking, Jennifer engineers her escape through the basement. There, she finds Geiger and falls into a pool filled with maggot-infested corpses. Brückner taunts Jennifer, but Geiger frees himself and furiously beats Brückner long enough to let Jennifer escape.

Jennifer finds Brückner's son, who has a hideously deformed face. He chases Jennifer onto a motorboat and tries to kill her with a spear, which perforates the boat's fuel tank and causes a leak. Jennifer summons a swarm of flies that attack the killer, causing him to fall into the water. Jennifer is also forced to jump into the water as the leaking petrol ignites, whereupon the child grabs her, but he is immolated by the flames.

Jennifer reaches the shore just as Morris appears. A severely injured and disfigured Brückner decapitates him from behind with a metal sheet and confesses that she murdered McGregor and Geiger to protect her son. Before she can murder Jennifer, a wrathful Inga attacks Brückner and kills her with a straight-razor in retribution for McGregor's death. With the ordeal over, Jennifer and Inga embrace.

Cast

Production

Argento became inspired to write and direct Phenomena after hearing a French radio broadcast detailing a murder case that had been solved thanks to the study of insects present on the corpse. In an interview with La Stampa, Argento said he saw the film as a personal challenge to American cinema. Screenwriter Franco Ferrini stated that, visually, Argento was inspired by Caspar David Friedrich paintings, noting the artist's purely Romantic portrayal of people and nature. Argento later stated that he imagined the movie taking place in a world where Nazism had triumped during the Second World War.

The film's budget went in excess of six million lire, largely on account of the insects and arachnids used. Spiders, including black widows, and scorpions were imported from Africa, while flies, grasshoppers and wasps were raised in various parts of Rome. For the scene where Jennifer follows the fly, Argento, recalling a trick learned from his childhood, had a real fly leashed with a nylon string.

Originally, Argento wanted Connelly's character to be portrayed as the daughter of Al Pacino, and planned to have photos and video clips of him included in the film. Pacino, however, refused to allow this, as, according to Argento, he "didn't appreciate telling the story of a daughter he doesn't have".

The chimpanzee, Tanga, who had previously starred in Bingo Bongo, proved difficult to direct, as Argento wanted to avoid its performance seeming comical. During the film's climax, the hand wielding the straight razor hitting Daria Nicolodi was in fact Tanga's own, which managed to scar her despite the object being blunted. It then proceeded to attack Jennifer Connelly and bit off part of one of her fingers. Connelly stated on Late Night with Conan O'Brien that Tanga continued to act aggressively toward her from that point on, thus necessitating a body double for some scenes. Further problems arose when Tanga escaped during an outdoor scene and did not return for three days until forest rangers attracted it with food.

As with his previous slasher films, Argento's own gloved hands were used during murder scenes.

Special effects
For the swarming scenes, special effects artist Sergio Stivaletti superimposed slowed-down footage of coffee granules floating down a fish tank over the film shot. Stivaletti also created a mechanical firefly prop for close up shots, but it was rejected by Argento.

For Frau Brückner's son, Stivaletti drew inspiration from photographs he saw of sufferers of Patau syndrome. In a 2015 interview, actor Davide Marotta, who played Brückner's son, recalled the lengthy process of making a mold of his head, and stated that his death scene involved being smeared in glucose before having 40 million insects released on him.

Soundtrack
Unlike Argento's previous films, Phenomena adopts a mid-1980s trend of containing popular songs in the soundtrack. This includes original compositions from artists such as Bill Wyman and Claudio Simonetti, with the solo soprano voice of Pina Magri, heavy metal music by artists like Iron Maiden as well as goth favorites such as Sex Gang Children.  The band Goblin is credited as contributing to the score, including two cues from their score from Dawn of the Dead, which are faintly heard when the character Sophie watches television in the film as well as a handful of original themes recorded for the film and credited to the group.

Cinevox released the soundtrack to the film in 1985 on vinyl, which included parts of the film's score and the rock music tracks. A compact disc edition was released by Cinevox in 1987. Enigma Records issued a vinyl release in 1985 bearing the Creepers title in the United States.

In 2018, the complete soundtrack was released for the first time by Waxwork Records on a double LP. It included alternate, bonus, and unused tracks.

Release
Phenomena was released theatrically in Italy on 31 January 1985 with a 116-minute running time. This version of Phenomena is often referred to as the "integral cut". A shorter version of the film was prepared for international release that had a 110-minute running time. This version of the film only cuts out minor material from the "integral cut" with most being a few frames at the end and beginning of shots. Phenomena was a big hit in Italy earning 2.7 billion lire at the box office, which had it out gross films like Gremlins, Dune and The Terminator.

In the United States, the film was acquired for distribution by New Line Cinema, who released it on 30 August 1985 under the alternative title Creepers. This version of the film was truncated to 83 minutes, with scenes cut entirely and other scenes being re-ordered. Creepers also had music segue between scenes where previously they had no music and the loss of the song "Locomotive" by Motörhead. Troy Howarth, author of So Deadly, So Perverse: 50 Years of Italian Giallo Films described Creepers as being the last of Argento's films to receive "any kind of meaningful theatrical release" in the United States. The film was released in the United Kingdom in its shortened cut as Creepers in April 1986.

Critical response
Jon Pareles of The New York Times reviewed the Creepers cut of the film, finding that it "creaks along for its first hour or so, failing to work up any chills" and found the acting poor, writing that "The best acting is by an expressive, resourceful chimpanzee - definitely the year's Best Supporting Primate." Kim Newman (Monthly Film Bulletin) said the film contained "astonishingly awful performances" and that the dialogue contained several unintentionally humorous lines, which Newman attributed to a language problem. Newman discussed the film's look and style, opining that "Argento's films have their stylishness to fall back on, but here he is experimenting with a washed-out blue look influenced by Possession that works in short scenes but becomes wearying after a few minutes". Newman commented that Argento "goes for sickness after the manner of Lucio Fulci", noting gross-out scenes involving vomiting and violent deaths of actors portrayed by Argento's daughter and wife. The Guardian declared that Creepers was "Argento at his most throw away" and that the film paled in comparison to earlier efforts such as The Bird with the Crystal Plumage (1970) or Suspiria (1977). Commenting on the acting, the review stated that "Pleasence does his best with the script, Jennifer Connelly doesn't even bother to do battle".

The New York Daily News published a review in which they deemed Creepers "a boring, poorly told exercise in gratuitous nausea and Grand Guignol gore, padded with seemingly interminable stretches of static filler," though they conceded that it "boasts a semi-original premise for a slasher movie." The Times found that the film contained traces of previous Argento films, "But the march of time and commercial success seem to have dulled the director's previous panache: Creepers just drags its feet from one absurdity to the next." The Sunday Times found Creepers "only intermittently frightening" and an audience with "a taste for discreetly revealed schoolgirl thigh and/or insects will not be completely disappointed".

Malcolm Johnson of the Hartford Courant criticized some of the film's special effects, but concluded: "Otherwise, Argento displays his customary skill at horror chic. He plays Old World elegance against horrific sights as electronic scoring and macabre rock songs by Bill Wyman, Iron Maiden, and others give Creepers a loud, mad buzz."

In retrospective reviews, John Kenneth Muir discussed the film in his overview of horror films from the 1980s, finding Phenomena to be "unusual" as well as "strangely stirring", and that the imagery in the film is "nothing short of amazing, even if the narrative is muddled."

Home media
Creepers was released in the United States on VHS and Betamax in 1986 by Media Home Entertainment. This release still had the shorter theatrical run time. By March 29, Creepers entered Billboard'''s Top Videocassettes Rentals chart. This chart was compiled from a national sample of retail store rental reports. By April 5, the release was at number 29 in the charts.

The film was first released on DVD in North America by Anchor Bay Entertainment as Phenomena, where it used the 110 minute version of the film. Synapse Films released the film on Blu-ray in the United States on 15 November 2016, which included the shorter version titled Creepers as well as the 116 and 110 minute versions of Phenomena. Arrow Video released Phenomena in the United Kingdom in 2017 including the integral version, the international cut and the Creepers version. Arrow's Blu-ray was among the top ten top-selling home video releases in the United Kingdom on its initial release. In February 2022, Arrow reissued the film in 4K UHD Blu-ray format in three different limited editions, each featuring alternate artwork; one of the editions, available only through Arrow's online store, features artwork bearing the Creepers title. Synapse Films also reissued a 4K UHD Blu-ray in North America.

Legacy
After Phenomena, Daria Nicolodi repudiated the film, labeling it "reactionary" on account of its portrayal of handicapped people, and stated on interview that she would no longer work with Argento.

Japanese video game developer Hifumi Kono created his video game Clock Tower (1995) which borrows many ideas from Phenomena.

A novelisation of the film was written by Luigi Cozzi for the horror anthology Terrore profondo'' in 1997.

References

Sources

External links
 
 

 

1985 films
1985 horror films
1985 independent films
1980s supernatural horror films
Films set in boarding schools
English-language Italian films
Italian exploitation films
Films about insects
Films about primates
Films about telepathy
Films directed by Dario Argento
Films scored by Simon Boswell
Films set in Switzerland
Films shot in Switzerland
Films with screenplays by Dario Argento
Giallo films
Italian independent films
Italian supernatural horror films
Italian serial killer films
Mystery horror films
New Line Cinema films
1980s Italian films